Oscar William Strahan (August 10, 1891 – August 21, 1978) was an American football, basketball, and track coach and college athletics administrator. He was a student-athlete at Drake University in Des Moines, Iowa where he was a recipient of the school's Double D Award.

After coaching high school athletics in Iowa for three years, he became the head football coach (1919–1934) and head basketball coach (1920–1924, 1944–1946) at Southwest Texas State University–now known as Texas State University. He also served as the school's athletic director until his retirement and coach track for 39 years.

Strahan died on August 21, 1978.

Head coaching record

College football

References

External links
 

1891 births
1978 deaths
Drake Bulldogs football players
Texas State Bobcats football coaches
Texas State Bobcats men's basketball coaches
Texas State Bobcats athletic directors
Texas State Bobcats track and field coaches
High school football coaches in Iowa
Coaches of American football from Iowa
Players of American football from Iowa